The year 2009 is the eighth year in the history of Cage Warriors, a mixed martial arts promotion based in the United Kingdom. In 2009 Cage Warriors held 1 event, Cage Warriors 36: USA Destruction.

Events list

Cage Warriors 36: USA Destruction

Cage Warriors 36: USA Destruction was an event held on January 30, 2009 in Orlando, United States.

Results

References

Cage Warriors events
2009 in mixed martial arts